Tragon silaceoides is a species of beetle in the family Cerambycidae. It was described by Lepesme in 1952.

References

Pachystolini
Beetles described in 1952